The Pietenpol Air Camper is a simple parasol wing homebuilt aircraft designed by Bernard H. Pietenpol.  The first prototype that became the Air Camper was built and flown by Pietenpol in 1928.

Development
The Air Camper was designed to be built of spruce and plywood. One of Pietenpol's goals was to create a plane that was affordable and easy to construct for home builders. Building an Air Camper requires basic woodworking skills and tools. Builders also need to fabricate some metal fittings to attach the wooden parts together. Some welding is required. The plans for the Pietenpol Aircamper were originally published in a four-part serial in the "Flying and Glider" Manual of 1932-33.

The original model was flown using an Ace four cylinder water-cooled engine. The Model A Ford engine later became the standard powerplant used; the design was first flown with one in May 1929.

In the 1960s Bernard Pietenpol began to favor converted engines from Chevrolet Corvair automobiles. The Corvair flat six was higher horsepower, smoother, and significantly lighter, compared to the Model A, and was similar to those already available for general aviation use. The length of a Pietenpol varies with the engine choices, as lighter engines needed to be mounted further forward for weight and balance reasons. Over the years over 30 different engines have flown in the Pietenpol Air Camper. Many modern Pietenpol builders prefer Continental A65, C85 or C90 air-cooled flat fours. Several examples of the Aircamper have been built in Europe and in 2012 were still flying.

In the 1920s and 1930s, kits were available for the design, but there were none available again until 2015 when the Pietenpol Aircraft Company introduced a kit version of the Air Camper, with components supplied by Aircraft Spruce & Specialty. The kit includes all parts except the engine, dope, fabric covering, and hardware.

Variants
Pietenpol Sky Scout
BH Pietenpol also designed and published plans for a single-seat version of the aircraft named the Pietenpol Sky Scout, which was slightly smaller and was powered by the Ford Model T engine. During the late 1920s and early 1930s, this was less expensive than the Model A used in the Air Camper.
UK LAA-approved Pietenpol Air Camper
In some countries, civil aviation authority approval is required for each experimental aircraft design, in addition to the approval of each aircraft an individual makes, as in the US. A variant of the Pietenpol Air Camper was designed by Mr. J. K. Wills, and UK Light Aircraft Association approval was obtained for this variant. 

Grega GN-1 Aircamper
A plans-only homebuilt design similar to the Air Camper using a Piper Cub wing.
St Croix Pietenpol Aerial
A biplane adaptation, designed by Chad and Charles Willie and produced by St Croix Aircraft of Corning, Iowa, first flown in 1977.
St Croix Pietenpol Aircamper
An adaptation of the original design with more wingspan, longer fuselage and higher gross weight.

Specifications (Typical Air Camper)

See also

References

External links 

 Pietenpol Airplanes in MNopedia, the Minnesota Encyclopedia 
 Pietenpol family site
 Sky Camper history on AirVenture Museum site
 "The Pietenpol Story" by Chet Peek - Book covering the history of Bernard Pietenpol's Design
 Video of a Model A-engined Air Camper engine start and runup
 Walkaround and In-Flight Video of an original-style Air Camper 
 HOT ROD Magazine's 2008 article on "Four-Cylinder Engine Build – Building A Better ‘Banger" for Ford Model A and B engines, later used to power Air Campers
 Flysquirrel.net's PDF-format article on different engine choices for Air Campers

1920s United States civil utility aircraft
Homebuilt aircraft
Single-engined tractor aircraft
Parasol-wing aircraft
Aircraft first flown in 1928